Indrit Tuci (born 14 September 2000) is an Albanian professional footballer who plays as a forward for Croatian club Lokomotiva in the Croatian First Football League.

External links

2000 births
Living people
Association football forwards
Croatian Football League players
NK Lokomotiva Zagreb players
Albanian footballers
Albania under-21 international footballers
Albanian expatriate footballers
Expatriate footballers in Croatia
Albanian expatriates in Croatia